Christoph Teinert (born 30 January 1980 in Heidelberg) is a German football player, he last plays for VfR Aalen.

Career 
Teinert spent one season in the Bundesliga with 1. FSV Mainz 05.

Personal life 
He also holds Australian citizenship.

External links
  Official site

1980 births
Living people
Sportspeople from Heidelberg
German footballers
TSG 1899 Hoffenheim players
1. FSV Mainz 05 players
SpVgg Unterhaching players
FC Augsburg players
SV Wacker Burghausen players
VfR Aalen players
VfR Mannheim players
Bundesliga players
2. Bundesliga players
3. Liga players
Association football forwards
Footballers from Baden-Württemberg